Eugene Daniel Berce (November 22, 1926 – November 17, 2018) was an American basketball player. He played collegiately for the Cornell Big Red and what are now the Marquette Golden Eagles.

He was selected by the New York Knicks in the 1948 BAA draft. 
He played for the Tri-Cities Blackhawks (1949–50) in the NBA for 3 games. He was the first Marquette player to score 1,000 career points, and is in the Marquette Hall of Fame.

Berce died on November 17, 2018 at age 91.

Career statistics

NBA

Source

Regular season

References

External links

1926 births
2018 deaths
American men's basketball players
Basketball players from Milwaukee
Cornell Big Red men's basketball players
Marquette Golden Eagles men's basketball players
New York Knicks draft picks
Oshkosh All-Stars players
Tri-Cities Blackhawks players
Small forwards
Guards (basketball)
Marquette University High School alumni